Sir Arthur Frederick Sidgreaves  (12 June 1882 – 7 June 1948) was a British businessman who was head of Rolls-Royce, notably during World War II.

Early life
He was born 12 June 1882 in the Malay States, the son of Sir Thomas Sidgreaves, Chief Justice of the Supreme Court of the Straits Settlements, and Barbara Catharine. His father, suffering from financial problems, committed suicide in 1890.

He attended Downside School in Somerset. In the First World War, he served in the RNAS and RAF.

Career

Rolls-Royce
He joined Rolls-Royce in July 1920, where he was export manager in the London offices. In 1926 he became General Sales Manager. In 1929 he became managing director, where he was managing director for 17 years, and throughout the war.
From 1935, the British government introduced its shadow factory programme, and he jointly instigated the Rolls-Royce factory to produce the Rolls-Royce Merlin engine in Cheshire. Another factory was built at Hillington, Scotland, which went into production six months after commencement of being built. He helped get the Merlin engine manufactured in the US, under licence.

It was his decision that the Merlin engine was developed. He also took a part in developing the jet engine. He had no vast technical knowledge, but was an astute, and no-nonsense, businessman.

Personal life

He lived at Penn, Buckinghamshire. He was appointed the OBE in 1918. In 1938 he married Dorothy Jessica in Hove, Sussex. An earlier marriage in 1916 in Kensington had produced two sons in 1917 and 1921.

In the 1945 New Year Honours, he was knighted for his services during the war. On Monday 7 June 1948, disturbed by an unfavourable medical report, he threw himself under a train at Green Park underground station. He had a throat infection and was 66.

References

External links
Grace's Guide

1882 births
1948 deaths
British manufacturing chief executives
Knights Bachelor
Officers of the Order of the British Empire
People educated at Downside School
People from Chiltern District
Rolls-Royce people
Royal Air Force personnel of World War I
Royal Naval Air Service personnel of World War I
20th-century British businesspeople
British people in British Malaya